William G. Shaughnessy was an American politician who served as mayor of Woburn, Massachusetts and was a member of the Massachusetts House of Representatives.

Early life
Shaughnessy was born on July 10, 1918 in Woburn. He graduated from Woburn High School and the Bentley School of Accounting and Finance. Outside of politics,  Shaughnessy worked as an accountant and was the president of Wells Package Store, Inc.

Political career
From 1948 to 1951, Shaughnessy was a member of the Woburn school committee. He then served on the city council from 1954 to 1955. From 1956 to 1960 he was the mayor of Woburn. In 1958 he was a candidate for State Treasurer. He lost in the Democratic primary to incumbent John Francis Kennedy 62% to 38%.

Shaughnessy returned to elected office in 1975 as a member of the Massachusetts House of Representatives. He represented the 29th Middlesex district until 1979.

Death
Shaughnessy died on July 21, 2001 at the Lahey Clinic in Burlington, Massachusetts.

References

1

1928 births
2001 deaths
American accountants
Bentley University alumni
Democratic Party members of the Massachusetts House of Representatives
People from Woburn, Massachusetts
20th-century American politicians
Woburn Memorial High School alumni